Birke is a given name and surname. Notable people with the name include:

Given name
Birke J. Bertelsmeier (born 1981), German composer
Birke Bull-Bischoff 1963), German politician
Birke Bruck, German actress
Birke Häcker (born 1977), German legal scholar

Surname
Adolf M. Birke (born 1939), German modern history professor
Hanne Birke, Danish orienteering competitor
Kim Birke (born 1987), German handball player

See also
Berke (name), given name and surname
Birk (name), given name and surname
Burke, given name and surname